Mowlem was one of the largest construction and civil engineering companies in the United Kingdom. Carillion bought the firm in 2006.

History
The firm was founded by John Mowlem in 1822, and was continued as a partnership by successive generations of the Mowlem and Burt families, including George Burt, and Sir John Mowlem Burt.

The company was awarded a Royal Warrant in 1902 and went public on the London Stock Exchange in 1924. During the Second World War the company was one of the contractors engaged in building the Mulberry harbour units.

A long-standing national contractor, Mowlem developed a network of regional contracting businesses including Rattee and Kett of Cambridge (bought in 1926); E. Thomas of the west country (bought in 1965) and the formation of a northern region based in Leeds in 1970. The network was further augmented by the acquisition of Ernest Ireland of Bath (bought in 1977), and the acquisition of McTay Engineering of Bromborough, together with its shipbuilding subsidiary McTay Marine (also bought in the late 1970s).

In 1971 the company expanded overseas purchasing a 40% shareholding in an Australian contractor, Barclay Brothers, and later taking 100% ownership. The Australian business, re-branded Barclay Mowlem, expanded into all other Australian mainland states, except South Australia, and into Asia.

Mowlem acquired SGB Group, a supplier of scaffolding, in 1986. Mowlem also bought Unit Construction in 1986, giving the firm a substantial presence in private housebuilding - within two years, sales were up to an annual rate of 1,200. The ensuing recession led to losses of over £180m between 1991 and 1993 and banking covenants came under pressure. The housing division was sold to Beazer in 1994.

Mowlem was bought by Carillion in February 2006.

Major projects

Major projects undertaken by or involving Mowlem included:

Billingsgate Fish Market completed in 1874
Smithfield Fruit Market completed in 1882
Imperial Institute completed in 1887
Woolwich Ferry terminals opened in 1889
Liverpool Street station and the Great Eastern Hotel completed in 1891
Institution of Civil Engineers building completed in 1911
Admiralty Arch completed in 1912
Port of London Authority Building completed in 1919
Bush House completed in 1923
London Post Office Railway completed in 1927
Piccadilly Circus tube station completed in 1928
Battersea Power Station completed in 1933
Mulberry harbour units completed in 1943
Reconstruction works at Buckingham Palace in 1943 following bomb damage
Reconstruction of the House of Commons in 1947 also following bomb damage
William Girling Reservoir completed in 1951
Hunterston A nuclear power station completed in 1957
Strand underpass completed in 1962
Millbank Tower completed in 1963
Reconstruction of 10 Downing Street in 1963
Marine terminal for a joint venture of Esso and Pappas Petroleum in Thessaloniki completed in 1965
New altar for Westminster Abbey in 1966
London Bridge completed in 1972
Natwest Tower completed in 1979
Mount Pleasant Airfield completed in 1986
Docklands Light Railway completed in 1987
Manchester Metrolink completed in 1991
Refurbishment of Thames House completed in 1994
Refurbishment of the Albert Memorial completed in 1998
Expansion of James Cook University Hospital completed in 2003
Spinnaker Tower completed in 2005
Twickenham Stadium South Stand completed in 2006
Dublin Port Tunnel completed in 2006

Mowlem was also the owner and developer of London City Airport completed in 1986.

See also
 John Mowlem - Biography of the founder of the company
 George Burt - Biography of his successor as manager of the company
 Edgar Beck - Biography of chairman then president between 1961-2000
 Frank Baines History of John Mowlem unpublished typescript history held at London Metropolitan Archives

References

Sources

 Mowlem 1822–1972 – Mowlem Public Relations brochure, 1972

British companies established in 1822
Construction and civil engineering companies of the United Kingdom
Companies formerly listed on the London Stock Exchange
1822 establishments in England
Defunct construction and civil engineering companies
British companies disestablished in 2006
Construction and civil engineering companies established in 1822
2006 disestablishments in England
Construction and civil engineering companies disestablished in 2006